Umberto Marengo (born 21 July 1992 in Giaveno) is an Italian cyclist, who currently rides for UCI ProTeam .

Major results

2013
 9th Coppa della Pace
2017
 Challenge du Prince
1st Trophée de l'Anniversaire
8th Trophée Princier
 Les Challenges de la Marche Verte
2nd GP Sakia El Hamra
4th GP Oued Eddahab
5th GP Al Massira
 5th Giro del Medio Brenta
 7th Overall Tour du Maroc
2018
 6th Trofeo Città di Brescia
 9th Trofeo Alcide Degasperi
2019
 1st Stage 1 Tour of Utah
 5th Overall Tour of Taiyuan
 10th Coppa Bernocchi

Grand Tour general classification results timeline

References

External links

1992 births
Living people
Italian male cyclists
Cyclists from Piedmont
People from Giaveno
Sportspeople from the Metropolitan City of Turin